Mohammad Waleed Yaseen Al-Alawneh (born 18 June 1988) is a Jordanian former football player who played as a midfielder.

International career 
Al-Alawneh played his first international match against Egypt in an international friendly on 27 January 2016, which Jordan won 1–0.

International career statistics

References

External links 

Jordanian footballers
Association football forwards
1988 births
Al-Ahli SC (Amman) players
Shabab Al-Ordon Club players
Living people
Jordan international footballers
Sportspeople from Amman
Al-Faisaly SC players
Mansheyat Bani Hasan players
Al-Hussein SC (Irbid) players
Al-Sareeh SC players
Jordanian Pro League players